William Lang (born about 1838) was a professional British runner, who set world records in numerous running events in the 1860s, including a mile record which stood for 16 years.

In the 1850s and 1860s, with the advent of accurate timing devices and precisely measured running courses, the sport of running, called "pedestrianism," became extremely popular, especially in Britain.

On 19 August 1865, the greatest field of milers ever assembled to that time raced at the Royal Oak Grounds in Manchester for the Mile Championship Cup, £30, and title of "Champion Miler of the World." Included in the field of nine professionals were Siah Albison, who had set a mile record at the same location in 1860 at 4:22¼, Lang who had broken Albison's record in 1863, and Edward Mills, the current record holder in the event at 4:20, set on 25 June 1864 also at Manchester.

Lang was nicknamed the "Crowcatcher" and had set records in the two mile and six mile events in 1863. He had also run the mile in 4:21¾ that year and was eager to win this race.

A crowd of 15,000 watched the race, which also included Scot Robert McInstray, world-record holder in the 880-yard race, 4:21½ miler James Sanderson, the Welsh mile champion William Richards and half-miler rabbit James Nuttall. As bets were being placed, word came through that Mills was limping and would not be able to compete, meaning that Lang was now the clear favourite.

Nuttall led the field around the 651-yard track and hit the quarter-mile mark in 60 seconds, an unsustainable pace. The crowd cheered, and excitement built as Nuttall hit the half in 2:05½. Nuttall started to fade, and Lang took over the lead and at the 3/4 mile point with a time of 3:14, which the crowd realized was fast enough to make this the first-ever mile run under 4:20.

As Lang headed into the backstretch, he tried to pull away, but McInstray kept pace as did the previously unheralded Richards. Albion had faded badly and was no longer a factor. As the three came onto the homestretch, the crowd roared, and McInstray lost ground. Richards, on the other hand, gained on Lang. At the finish, Richards pulled even and he and Lang crossed the line together. Though Lang's supporters howled with rage, the judges ruled the race a tie.

Their time was 4:17¼, a time not surpassed until William Cummings ran 4:16 16 years later.

Because the public was not satisfied with a tie, a run-off was held a week later, and Lang beat Richards in 4:22.

References

Cordner Nelson and Roberto Quercetani, The Milers, Tafnews Press, 1985, pp. 1–3
Edward Seldon Sears, Running Through the Ages, Mcfarland, 2001, pp. 112–3

British male middle-distance runners
1830s births
Year of death unknown